Eurythmics Live is a live concert video by the British pop/rock duo Eurythmics, filmed during their Revenge Tour at Sydney Entertainment Centre in Sydney, Australia on 14 February 1987.

Track listing 
The intro and some segments in between songs feature the band filmed in a studio, including Patrick Seymour's keyboard intro to "Sweet Dreams (Are Made of This)" and Jimmy 'Z' Zavala's harmonica intro to "Missionary Man".

 It Could Be the Future (spoken word prologue, shot in a studio) 
 "Sexcrime (1984)"
 "Let's Go"
 "The Last Time"
 "Here Comes the Rain Again"
 "It's Alright (Baby's Coming Back)"
 "When Tomorrow Comes"
 "There Must Be an Angel (Playing with My Heart)"
 "Who's That Girl?"
 "Right by Your Side"
 "Thorn in My Side"
 "Sweet Dreams (Are Made of This)"
 "Would I Lie to You?" / "Day Tripper" (medley)
 "Missionary Man"
 "Sisters Are Doin' It for Themselves"
 "The Miracle of Love"
 End credits - "The Miracle of Love" (instrumental studio version)

The video omits the following songs that were performed during the concert:
 "I Love You Like a Ball and Chain" (originally performed after "Let's Go")
 "Conditioned Soul" (originally performed after "Who's That Girl?").

Songs issued on records 
 "Here Comes the Rain Again" was included on the CD single "You Have Placed a Chill in My Heart" (1988).
 "There Must Be an Angel (Playing with My Heart)" was included on the CD single for "Shame" (1987).
 "Missionary Man" was included on the album Eurythmics Live 1983–1989 (1993) and the CD single for "I Need a Man" (1988).
 "The Miracle of Love" was included on the album Eurythmics Live 1983–1989 (1993), though were incorrectly credited on it as recorded in Paris in September 1989. On the CD version, the track has been truncated, removing a short speech by Annie Lennox.

Formats 

 VHS Videotape
 LaserDisc
 UK PAL 
 US NTSC 
 Japan NTSC
 DVD 
 Brazil (FanFasq label)
 Argentina (Garra Media label, 2011)

External links

Footnotes 

1987 video albums
Eurythmics video albums
Live video albums
Concert films
PolyGram video albums
Films directed by Geoff Wonfor